Mishkal Ramsaroop (born 20 August 1993) is a South African first-class cricketer. He was included in the KwaZulu-Natal cricket team squad for the 2015 Africa T20 Cup.

References

External links
 

1993 births
Living people
South African cricketers
KwaZulu-Natal cricketers
Cricketers from Durban